Anderson Township is one of fourteen townships in Madison County, Indiana, United States. As of the 2010 census, its population was 56,436 and it contained 28,001 housing units.  Aside from the exclaves of Country Club Heights, Woodlawn Heights and River Forest and the town of Edgewood, the entire township is within the city limits of Anderson.

Geography

Cities, towns, villages
 Anderson (vast majority)
 Country Club Heights
 Edgewood
 River Forest
 Woodlawn Heights

Communities
 Brentwood at 
 Crestlawn at 
 Eastern Heights at 
 Elmhurst at 
 Extension Heights at 
 Fairfax at 
 Forest Hills at 
 Glyn Ellen at 
 Grandview at 
 Gridley at 
 Harmeson Heights at 
 Hillcrest at 
 Irondale at 
 Lowmandale at 
 Meadowbrook at 
 South Edgewood at 
 Western Village at 
(This list is based on USGS data and may include former settlements.)

Cemeteries
The township contains these seven cemeteries: Booco, Maplewood, Moss, Pleasant Walk, Saint Marys, Vandeventer and West Maplewood.

Major highways
  Interstate 69
  State Road 9
  State Road 32
  State Road 109

Airports and landing strips
 Community Hospital Airport
 Rolling Hills Convalescent Center Airport

Landmarks
 Hoosier Park Horse Track

Education
 Anderson Community School Corporation

Anderson Township residents may obtain a free library card from the Anderson Public Library in Anderson.

Political districts
 Indiana's 6th congressional district
 State House District 35
 State House District 36
 State House District 37
 State Senate District 25

References
 
 United States Census Bureau 2008 TIGER/Line Shapefiles
 IndianaMap

External links
 Indiana Township Association
 United Township Association of Indiana
 City-Data.com page for Anderson Township
 Anderson Township History

Townships in Madison County, Indiana
Townships in Indiana